In the Long Run is a British comedy-drama television series created by Idris Elba which premiered on Sky One on 29 March 2018. Loosely based on Elba’s childhood, the show is set in the 1980s on the gritty, fictitious Eastbridge Estate in East London. The series follows the Easmon family; Walter (Elba), his wife Agnes (Madeline Appiah) and their 13-year-old British-born son Kobna (Sammy Kamara) who have settled in England after having arrived from Sierra Leone.

Cast and characters

Main 
 Idris Elba as Walter Easmon (series 1–present), patriarch of the Easmon family
 Bill Bailey as Terence 'Bagpipes' De La Croix (series 1–present), Walter's best friend
 Madeline Appiah as Agnes Easmon (series 1–present), Walter's wife
 Jimmy Akingbola as Valentine Easmon (series 1–present), Walter's younger brother
 Kellie Shirley as Kirsty De La Croix (series 1–present), 'Bagpipes' wife 
 Sammy Kamara as Kobna Easmon (series 1–present), Walter and Agnes' British-born son
 Mattie Boys as Dean De La Croix (series 1–present), 'Bagpipes' and Kirsty's son

Recurring 
 Neil D'Souza as Rajesh (series 1–present), Walter and Bagpipes' factory boss
 Curtis Walker as Leon (series 2–present), Melissa's biological father
 Amani Johnson as Melissa (series 1–present), Kirsty's daughter 
 Deno as Singing Boy (series 1)
 Malaki Paul as Singing Boy (Series 2-present)
 Kadeem Ramsay as John "Barney" (Series 2-present)
 Jude Akuwudike (series 1–present) as Uncle Akie

Guest stars 
 Ellen Thomas as Mama (series 3; episodes 1-2), Walter's mother

Episodes

Series 1 (2018)

Series 2 (2019)

Series 3 (2020)

Production

Development
In the Long Run is filmed at various locations across London including Kingston, Lewisham, Southwark and Lambeth. The housing estate scenes are filmed at Cambridge Road and Czar Street Estates in Lewisham and Kingston upon Thames, respectively. The Milton Arms pub interior scenes are shot at the Peckham Liberal Club, with exterior shots filmed at the Wheelshunters Club in Hornshay Street, Southwark. 

The singing boy in series 1, known only as Singing Boy in the show’s credits, is young Eritrean-British singing sensation Deno Michael Mebrahitu aka Deno. The singer has had over 46 million listens on Spotify. 2012's Britain’s Got Talent semi-finalist Malakai Paul is the current Singing Boy, after taking over from Deno from series 2.

Reception
The Guardian described In the Long Run as "less likely to prompt belly laughs than instil a warm glow, and has the unmistakable feel of a comedy still finding its feet. At its heart, however, it's a joyful portrait of community and camaraderie, of home and belonging, of dreams and joie de vivre."

References

External links

2018 British television series debuts
2020 British television series endings
2010s British sitcoms
2020s British sitcoms
English-language television shows
Race and ethnicity in television
Sky UK original programming
Television shows set in England